Renedi Masampu (born 17 September 1999) is an English footballer who plays as a left-back.

Early life
Born in London, Masampu is of Congolese descent. He started his career with the Metropolitan Police Football Club, and was voted youth team player of the year in 2017. Due to his good performances, he was scouted by Premier League giants Chelsea, who invited him on trial. After impressing on trial, Masampu completed the shock move alongside other non-league players Adebambo Akinjogbin and Tushaun Walters.

Following two seasons with Chelsea, in which he featured sparingly, Masampu was initially set for release in June 2018. However, he signed an extension to his short-term deal in July 2018, and was featuring for the club's under-23 side in September of the same year.

Club career
Following his eventual release from Chelsea in 2019, Masampu would go on to join non-league Whyteleafe. However, he did not stay long, and was playing for National League South side Dulwich Hamlet in 2020.

After leaving Dulwich Hamlet in November 2020, Masampu spent time on trial with EFL League One clubs Sheffield Wednesday and Portsmouth, as well as Championship club Birmingham City. Masampu signed for Birmingham City in November 2021 on a deal until June 2022. He received a first-team squad number and was one of four inexperienced players named on the bench for the visit to Preston North End in January 2022, remained unused in that and two further matches, and was released when his contract expired at the end of the season.

Career statistics

References

1999 births
Living people
Footballers from Greater London
English footballers
Association football defenders
Metropolitan Police F.C. players
Chelsea F.C. players
Whyteleafe F.C. players
Dulwich Hamlet F.C. players
Birmingham City F.C. players
Isthmian League players
National League (English football) players
Black British sportspeople
English sportspeople of Democratic Republic of the Congo descent